Lonchodidae is a family of stick insects, with more than 150 genera and 1,000 described species.

The subfamilies Necrosciinae and Lonchodinae, formerly part of Diapheromeridae, were determined to make up a separate family and were transferred to the re-established family Lonchodidae in 2018.

Subfamilies and tribes
 Lonchodinae Brunner von Wattenwyl, 1893
 tribe Eurycanthini Brunner von Wattenwyl, 1893
 tribe Lonchodini Brunner von Wattenwyl, 1893
 tribe not determined
 genus Megalophasma Bi, 1995
 genus Papuacocelus Hennemann & Conle, 2006
 Necrosciinae Brunner von Wattenwyl, 1893
 tribe Necrosciini Brunner von Wattenwyl, 1893

References

External links

 

Phasmatodea families